It Can't Be! is a 1975 Soviet comedy film directed by Leonid Gaidai. It consists of three short stories, based on the works of Mikhail Zoshchenko: Crime and Punishment, Fun Adventure and Wedding Event.

Crime and Punishment

Plot 
In the first novel describes the complexity of the shop manager Gorbushkin living in Soviet times, the end of the 1920s on unearned income. Being called to the investigator, he thoroughly believes that this will not bring anything good. These thoughts go to his wife and brother-in-law. Anna Vasilyevna, who, in order to prevent the inevitable confiscations of property urgently sell everything that was acquired by "back-breaking" labor. In addition, Anna hastily divorces with the main character and marries a neighbor, Vitaly Borisovich. And Gorbushkin, who is only called as a witness (a week before he still got arrested), returns in a good mood back home.

Cast 
 Mikhail Pugovkin — Gorbushkin, store manager
 Nina Grebeshkova — Anna Vasilyevna, Gorbushkin's wife
 Vyacheslav Nevinny — Gorbushkin's brother-in-law, beer seller
 Mikhail Svetin — Vitaly Borisovich Bananov, Gorbushkin's neighbor
 Radner Muratov — militiaman
 Lev Polyakov — investigator
 Natalya Krachkovskaya — buyer of paintings
 Igor Yasulovich — Lyolik, buyer of paintings' husband
 Georgy Svetlani — beer lover
 Viktor Uralsky — little man with a pig
 Vladimir Gulyaev — the one-eyed furniture buyer
 Eduard Bredun — assistant buyer of furniture

Fun Adventure

Plot 
The following short story of the film shows the intricacies of extramarital relations. Heading into the weekend supposedly to work, but in reality to his mistress, and sometimes hard to imagine that her husband's mistress could be lover lover friend, neighbor, friend and lover in the communal - a lover of your own wife. In the end, all six characters is purely coincidental, with interesting circumstances intersect together and gathered around the table, trying to find a way out of this situation, but in the end did not need and did not come. In any case, such a conclusion can be drawn from rolling in extreme caricature dispute sixes at the table.

Cast 
 Oleg Dahl — Anatoly (a.k.a. Anatole) Barygin-Amurskiy
 Svetlana Kryuchkova — Zinaida (a.k.a. Zinulya), Nicholas's wife
 Mikhail Kokshenov — Sophia's neighbor
 Natalya Seleznyova — Tatiana (a.k.a. Tanya) Barygin-Amurskya, Anatoly's wife
 Evgeny Zharikov — Nicholas (a.k.a. Coca), Zinaida's husband
 Larisa Eryomina — Sophia (a.k.a. Sofochka), Zinaida's girlfriend and «former ballerina of noblewomen»
 Zoya Isayeva — Sophia's neighbor, wash clothes in the basin
 Elena Volskaya — flower-girl
 Georgi Yumatov — passer-by with a bulldog

Wedding Event 
In the final novel by the young man, Vladimir Zavitushkin, fails to offer a hand and heart, he comes to his own wedding, where he can not find a bride - before they met only on the street, and he memorized her in winter clothes. Attempts to discreetly find out who of the women present is his future wife, lead to unpredictable consequences - the bridegroom takes the bride (and she does have a daughter (and not one) - very little) for her mother.

Cast 
 Leonid Kuravlyov — Vladimir Zavitushkin, groom
 Valentina Telichkina — Catherine, Zavitushkin's bride
 Lyudmila Shagalova — mother of Catherine
 Georgy Vitsin — father of Catherine
 Savely Kramarov — Sergei Ivanovich (a.k.a. Seryoga), Zavitushkin's friend, womanizer and heartthrob
 Svetlana Kharitonova — Elmira, Catherine's girlfriend, always says: «enchanting!»
 Sergey Filippov — singer
 Natalya Krachkovskaya — 1st guest
 Igor Yasulovich — 2nd guest
 Eve Kivi — wife of Ivan Izrailevich
 Gotlib Roninson — Ivan Izrailevich, one of the guests
Klara Rumyanova — one of the wedding guests

Soundtrack

References

External links 

1975 films
1975 romantic comedy films
Films about weddings
Films based on works by Mikhail Zoshchenko
Films directed by Leonid Gaidai
Films scored by Aleksandr Zatsepin
Films set in 1927
Films set in the Soviet Union
Films shot in Astrakhan
Films shot in Moscow
Mosfilm films
1970s Russian-language films
Russian anthology films
Russian romantic comedy films
Soviet romantic comedy films
Soviet anthology films